is a Japanese manga artist born in Tomakomai, Hokkaido and raised in Chiba Prefecture. He has formerly worked under the pseudonym . He is married to illustrator .

Sanbe was an honorable mention in the 1990 40th Tezuka Award and a semi-final winner in the 41st iteration. His manga, Erased, was nominated for the 18th Tezuka Osamu Cultural Prize Reader Award.

History 
After graduating from high school, Sanbe moved to Tokyo to study background art production at the Tokyo Designer Gakuin College. He cites Lupin the Third'''s The Castle of Cagliostro as the driving force behind his enrollment and overall interest in drawing background art. He made his debut in the game magazine Dengeki Adventures.
During his time in school, Sanbe came across a job listing in Weekly Shōnen Jump from Hirohiko Araki, requesting for new assistants. While not particularly a fan of the JoJo's Bizarre Adventure series, its variety of backgrounds and foreign settings enticed him to submit an application. After applying twice, Sanbe was accepted into Araki's team around the time of Battle Tendency's serialization and was eventually promoted to chief assistant. He would go on to work for Araki for a total of eight years before leaving halfway through Golden Wind to pursue his own career as a manga artist. When Testarotho, Kamiyadori, and Erased were published in tankōbon form, Araki gave his endorsement on the obi.

Works
 Testarotho (2001–02)
 Kamiyadori (2004–06)
 Kamiyadori no Nagi (2008–2010)
 Hohzuki Island (2008–09)
 Mōryō no Yurikago (2010–12)
 Black Road 
 Hataru Puzzle Nanako-san Teki na Nichijō Nanako-san Teki na Nichijō Re Nanako-san Teki na Nichijō Dash!! Erased (2012–2016)
 For the Kid I saw in my Dreams Island in a Puddle 13-kai Me no Ashiato Otogi no Hako no Reto''

References

External links
 

 
Living people
Manga artists from Hokkaido
People from Tomakomai, Hokkaido
Year of birth missing (living people)